NGC 5033 is an inclined spiral galaxy located in the constellation Canes Venatici.  Distance estimates vary from between 38 and 60 million light years from the Milky Way. The galaxy has a very bright nucleus and a relatively faint disk.  Significant warping is visible in the southern half of the disk.  The galaxy's relatively large angular size and relatively high surface brightness make it an object that can be viewed and imaged by amateur astronomers.  The galaxy's location relatively near Earth and its active galactic nucleus make it a commonly studied object for professional astronomers.

Nucleus

NGC 5033 contains a Seyfert nucleus, a type of active galactic nucleus.  Like many other active galactic nuclei, this galaxy's nucleus is thought to contain a supermassive black hole.  The bright emission seen in visible light (as well as other wavebands) is partially produced by the hot gas in the environment around this black hole.

Integral field spectroscopic observations of the center of NGC 5033 indicate that the Seyfert nucleus is not located at the kinematic center of the galaxy (the point around which the stars in the galaxies rotate).  This has been interpreted as evidence that this galaxy has undergone a merger.  The displacement of the Seyfert nucleus from the kinematic center may destabilize the rotation of gas in the center of the galaxy, which could cause gas to fall into the Seyfert nucleus.  The gas would be compressed by the enormous gravitational forces in the center of the Seyfert nucleus and become hot, thus making the nucleus appear bright or "active".

Nearby galaxies
NGC 5033 and the nearby spiral galaxy NGC 5005 comprise a physical galaxy pair.  The two galaxies weakly influence each other gravitationally, but they are not yet close enough to each other to be distorted by the tidal forces of the gravitational interaction. The fainter irregular galaxy IC 4182 is also a member of this group.

References

External links
 

Unbarred spiral galaxies
Seyfert galaxies
Canes Venatici
5033
08307
45948